Khoksar Parbaha  is a market center and town in Shambhunath Municipality in Saptari District in the Sagarmatha Zone of south-eastern Nepal. The Khoksar Parbaha village development committee (VDC) was merged with Shambhunath, Mohanpur, Bhangaha, Basbalpur and Rampur Jamuwa VDCs to form a new municipality on 18 May 2014. At the time of the 1991 Nepal census, Khoksar Parbaha had a population of 2,964 people and 534 individual households. Khoksar Parbaha is bordered by Shambhunath and Terahauta.

References

Populated places in Saptari District